RAO Video is a family run video rental store located in Little Rock, Arkansas. It is one of the oldest and continually operating video rental stores in the world.

RAO originally opened in 1977 by Bob Oliver, same year George Atkinson began his pioneering of the video rental industry. Oliver was inspired by an article in The Wall Street Journal, however the public did not originally respond to his business idea. He operated a booth at the Arkansas State Fair for several years to educate the public about video tape.

The original store was located in a 10x10 sqft kiosk in Metrocentre Mall, an outdoor shopping district in downtown Little Rock. It then moved to the Donaghey Building, then to 615 Main St and finally to its present location in 2001 at 609 Main St.

The store features 30,000 titles on DVD and Blu-ray, including a wide selection of obscure titles, cult classics and adult films as well as adult toys. The store has also been expanded to include a vape shop and Oak Forest Vintage clothing.

References 

Vaping

Video rental services
Retail companies established in 1977
Companies based in Little Rock, Arkansas
1977 establishments in Arkansas